Falseuncaria is a genus of moths belonging to the family Tortricidae.

Species
Falseuncaria aberdarensis Aarvik, 2010
Falseuncaria brunnescens Bai Guo & Guo, 1996
Falseuncaria degreyana (McLachlan, 1869)
Falseuncaria kaszabi Razowski, 1966
Falseuncaria lechriotoma Razowski, 1970
Falseuncaria rjaboviana Kuznetzov, 1979
Falseuncaria ruficiliana (Haworth, [1811])

See also
List of Tortricidae genera

References

 , 2010: Review of East African Cochylini (Lepidoptera, Tortricidae) with description of new species. Norwegian Journal of Entomology 57 (2): 81-108. Abstract: .
 , 1958: Die Larvalsystematik der Wickler (Tortricidae und Carposinidae). Abhandlungen zur Larvalsystematik der Insekten 3: 1–269.
 , 2011: Diagnoses and remarks on genera of Tortricidae, 2: Cochylini (Lepidoptera: Tortricidae). SHILAP Revista de Lepidopterología 39 (156): 397–414.

External links
Tortricid.net

Cochylini
Tortricidae genera